Neyco is a French company founded in 1954, specialist in High Vacuum, UHV, Inorganic materials and thin films.

History 
Initially created to allow access to International semiconductors, Neyco developed  its area of expertise in Vacuum, Materials and Thin films: 
- Vacuum and UHV with mechanics (chambers, components, gauges, pumps ...) 
- Inorganic materials from Aluminum to Zirconium in all shapes (powders to targets) and all forms (metals, oxides, alloys, borides, nitrides, sulfides ...). 
- Thin films (i.e. layers below one micron) deposited under vacuum by thermal evaporation, electron beam, sputtering and/or laser ablation.

In 2017, Neyco Group also includes the activity of Kerdry, the biggest French operation and clean room only dedicated to thin films on request (evaporation, E-beam, sputtering) based in Lannion (France) known for optical deposition, metallic deposition and photolithography.

Located in Vanves, 3 km South of Paris, with production facilities in France and Great Britain, NEYCO is a European leading company in the fields of vacuum, thin film deposition and coating materials for PVD.

Neyco is also a member of the Society of Vacuum Coaters (USA) and of the European Material Research Society (EMRS).

Following its growth, Olivier Costa became the new General Manager of Neyco in October 2018.
Isabelle Richardt (CEO) has also been elected Secretary of SFV (French vacuum Society).

In July 2022 the French Groupe HEF acquired Neyco.

Product Focus 
Inorganic materials
Thin films
Vacuum
Silicon wafers
Bellows
Optical deposition
Gauges
Technical Lubs
Silicones
Metallic powder

Patents and awards 
Methods for Coating a Substrate and Forming a Colored Film and Related Device(2007)
In June 2014, Neyco received the innovation award presented by the Société Française du Vide for the project TACE (Target for Anti Charge Effect). .
In June 2015, Neyco received the Award for Best Project Success at the ACC Silicones Distributor Seminar.
KERDRY-Neyco is ISO9001 and have the CIR 2017 - 2018 -2019 agreement.

Publications linked to Neyco 

A. Allemand, E. Guillermin, Y. Le Petitcorps. Method for preparing a carbide ceramics multilayer coating on, and optionally in, a part made of a carbon-containing material using a reactive melt infiltration RMI technique (2016) 
G. Bernard-Granger and al. Thermoelectric properties of an N-type silicon–germanium alloy related to the presence of silica nodules dispersed in the microstructure. ScienceDirect, Volume 93 Pages 40–43 (2014)
A. Aassimea, F. Hamoudaa, I. Richardt, F. Baylea, V. Pillarda, P. Lecoeura, P. Auberta, D. Bouchiera. Anti-charging process for electron beam observation and lithography. Microelectronic Engineering, Volume 110, October 2013
J. Dejeu, J. Abadie, E. Piat, P. Rougeot, S. Oster, P. Stempflé & J. Takadoum. Development of a new nanotribometer with multi asperity contact. Nordtrib (2010), 1–9, quoted page 2.
B. Vincent, A. Boudrioua, R. Kremer, P. Moretti. Second harmonic generation in helium-implanted periodically poled lithium niobate planar waveguides. Optics Communications Volume 247 Pages 461–469 (2005)

References

Companies based in Paris
French companies established in 1954